Molde Fotballklubb, also known simply as Molde FK, is a Norwegian professional football club based in Molde. The club is affiliated with Nordmøre og Romsdal Fotballkrets and play their home games at Aker Stadion. Formed on 19 June 1911, the club have won five national league titles and five national cup titles. Molde participated in the UEFA Champions League in 1999 where they met Real Madrid, Porto and Olympiacos in the group stage. This made them the second Norwegian football club, to have reached the group stage of the competition. Currently playing in Eliteserien, where the season lasts from March to November. They won their first championship in 2011, and defended the title in 2012. In 2014 they won their first league and cup double. Molde also had a successful period from 1994 to 2005, when they won two Norwegian Cup titles, and finished second in the league on four occasions. Since playing their first competitive match, a number of players have made a competitive first-team appearance for the club, of whom a number of players have made at least 100 appearances (including substitute appearances).

Molde's record appearance-maker is Daniel Berg Hestad, who made a total of 666 appearances over a 23-year playing career; he broke his father Stein Olav Hestad's previous appearance record.

List of players

Appearances and goals are for first-team competitive matches only, including Eliteserien, 1. divisjon, Norwegian Cup, Eliteserien play-offs, Champions League, UEFA Cup/Europa League and Cup Winners' Cup.
Players are listed according to the date of their first-team debut for the club.

This list is under construction. Statistics correct as of match played 13 November 2022

Table headers
 Nationality – If a player played international football, the country/countries he played for are shown. Otherwise, the player's nationality is given as their country of birth.
 Molde career – The year of the player's first appearance for Molde FK to the year of his last appearance.
 Total – The total number of matches played, both as a starter and as a substitute.

Most top division matches played
This is a list of players who has played more than 100 games for Molde in the top division. For a list of all Molde FK players with a Wikipedia article, see the Molde FK players' category. Players are listed according to total number of league games played. Substitute appearances included.

Last updated: 13 November 2022

Most top division goals scored
This is a list of players who has scored 10 goals or more for Molde in the top division.
 Last updated: 13 November 2022

Cup champions 1994 
The following players won the Norwegian Cup in 1994, when Molde won their first trophy after a 3–2 victory against Lyn in the final:
Morten Bakke, Trond Strande, Sindre Rekdal, Flaco, Knut Anders Fostervold, Ulrich Møller, Tarje Nordstrand Jacobsen, André Nevstad, Kjetil Rekdal, Daniel Berg Hestad, Tor Gunnar Johnsen, Ole Bjørn Sundgot, Arild Stavrum, Berdon Sønderland, Jan Berg, Petter Rudi.

Cup champions 2005 
The following players won the Norwegian Cup in 2005, when Molde won their second trophy after Lillestrøm was beaten 4–2 (a.e.t) in the final:
Marcus Andreasson, John Andreas Husøy, Matej Mavric, Rob Friend, Tommy Eide Møster, Toni Kallio, Knut Dørum Lillebakk, Stian Ohr, Magnus Kihlberg, Kai Røberg, Trond Strande, Mitja Brulc, Øyvind Gjerde, Daniel Berg Hestad, Thomas Mork, Petter Rudi, Dag Roar Ørsal, Øyvind Gram, Torgeir Hoås, Martin Høyem, Lars Ivar Moldskred, Erlend Ormbostad, Madiou Konate, Johan Nås, Torgeir Ruud Ramsli, Petter Christian Singsaas.

League champions 2011
The following players became league champions, when Molde won their first league title in 2011:
Davy Claude Angan, Jo Inge Berget, Daniel Chima, Vini Dantas, Pape Paté Diouf, Magnus Wolff Eikrem, Vegard Forren, Joshua Gatt, Daniel Berg Hestad, Thomas Holm, Magne Hoseth, Emil Johansson, Mattias Moström, José Mota, Espen Bugge Pettersen, Knut Olav Rindarøy, Magne Simonsen, Magnus Stamnestrø, Christian Steen, Makhtar Thioune, Zlatko Tripić, Pål Erik Ulvestad, Kristoffer Paulsen Vatshaug, Krister Wemberg

League champions 2012
The following players became league champions, when Molde won their second league title in 2012:
Davy Claude Angan, Jo Inge Berget, Abdou Karim Camara, Daniel Chima, Pape Paté Diouf, Magnus Wolff Eikrem, Emmanuel Ekpo, Vegard Forren, Joshua Gatt, Daniel Berg Hestad, Even Hovland, Magne Hoseth, Etzaz Hussain, Martin Linnes, Mattias Moström, Espen Bugge Pettersen, Knut Olav Rindarøy, Magne Simonsen, Magnus Stamnestrø, Børre Steenslid, Ole Söderberg, Zlatko Tripić, Kristoffer Paulsen Vatshaug

Cup champions 2013 
The following players won the Norwegian Cup in 2013, when Molde won their third cup trophy after a 4–2 victory against Rosenborg BK in the final:
Ørjan Nyland, Martin Linnes, Etzaz Hussain, Daniel Chima Chukwu, Even Hovland, Emmanuel Ekpo, Zlatko Tripić, Jo Inge Berget, Agnaldo Pinto de Moraes Júnior, Mattias Moström, Daniel Berg Hestad, Magne Simonsen, Magne Hoseth, Magnar Ødegaard, Knut Olav Rindarøy, Vegard Forren, Fredrik Gulbrandsen, Mats Møller Dæhli, Joona Toivio, Aliou Coly, Lauri Dalla Valle, Tommy Høiland, Eirik Hestad, Per Egil Flo, Børre Steenslid, Victor Johansen, Ole Söderberg, Magnus Wolff Eikrem, Joshua Gatt, Ivar Erlien Furu, Andreas Hollingen, Sander Svendsen.

League champions 2014 
The following players became league champions when Molde won their third league title in 2014:
Ørjan Nyland, Even Hovland, Martin Linnes, Per Egil Flo, Vegard Forren, Daniel Berg Hestad, Harmeet Singh, Mattias Moström, Mohamed Elyounoussi, Björn Bergmann Sigurdarson, Fredrik Gulbrandsen, Daniel Chima Chukwu, Tommy Høiland, Magne Hoseth, Pape Pate Diouf, Joona Toivio, Agnaldo Pinto de Moraes Júnior, Sander Svendsen, Knut Olav Rindarøy, Etzaz Hussain, Ruben Gabrielsen, Eirik Hestad, Magne Simonsen, Espen Bugge Pettersen

Cup champions 2014 
The following players won the Norwegian Cup in 2014, when Molde won their fourth cup trophy after a 2–0 victory against Odds BK in the final, and won the double for the first time in club history:
Ørjan Nyland, Joona Toivio, Martin Linnes, Per-Egil Flo, Vegard Forren, Harmeet Singh, Mattias Mostrøm, Etzaz Hussain, Mohamed Elyounoussi, Fredrik Gulbrandsen, Daniel Chima Chukwu, Espen Bugge Pettersen, Lunan Ruben Gabrielsen, Daniel Berg Hestad, Björn Bergmann Sigurdarson, Tommy Høiland, Knut Olav Rindarøy, Sander Svendsen, Ethan Horvath, Magne Simonsen, Emmanuel Ekpo, Agnaldo Pinto de Moraes Júnior, Pape Pate Diouf, Andreas Hollingen, Eirik Haugan, Ole Martin Rindarøy, Eirik Hestad, Magne Hoseth

League champions 2019 
The following players became league champions (minimum three appearances) when Molde won their fourth league title in 2019:
Eirik Ulland Andersen, Fredrik Aursnes, Martin Bjørnbak, Mathis Bolly, Tobias Christensen, Álex Craninx, Magnus Wolff Eikrem, Martin Ellingsen, Vegard Forren, Ruben Gabrielsen, Kristoffer Haraldseid, Kristoffer Haugen, Eirik Hestad, Etzaz Hussain, Leke James, Erling Knudtzon, Andreas Linde, Mattias Moström, Ohi Omoijuanfo, Christoffer Remmer, Fredrik Sjølstad, Henry Wingo

Norway international players 
The following players have represented Norway while playing for Molde.

 Trond Andersen
 Morten Bakke
 Jan Berg
 Jo Inge Berget
 Torkild Brakstad
 Ola Brynhildsen
 Mats Møller Dæhli
 Magnus Wolff Eikrem
 Mohamed Elyounoussi
 Jostein Flo
 Per-Egil Flo
 Vegard Forren
 Jan Fuglset
 Fredrik Gulbrandsen
 Hugo Hansen
 Åge Hareide
 Daniel Berg Hestad
 Harry Hestad
 Magne Hoseth
 Even Hovland
 Arne Legernes
 Øyvind Leonhardsen
 Martin Linnes
 Andreas Lund
 Ulrich Møller
 Roger Nilsen
 Ørjan Nyland
 Stian Ohr
 Odd Inge Olsen
 Espen Bugge Pettersen
 Kjetil Rekdal
 Knut Olav Rindarøy
 Petter Rudi
 Harmeet Singh
 Ole Gunnar Solskjær
 Arild Stavrum
 Ole Bjørn Sundgot

Source:

References

 
Molde FK
Association football player non-biographical articles